Wallace's hawk-eagle (Nisaetus nanus) is a species of bird of prey in the family Accipitridae. It is found in Kra Isthmus, Malay Peninsula, Sumatra and Borneo. Its natural habitat is subtropical or tropical moist lowland forests. It is threatened by habitat loss.

It is named after Alfred Russel Wallace, a British naturalist, explorer, geographer, anthropologist and biologist.

References

Wallace's hawk-eagle
Birds of Malesia
Wallace's hawk-eagle
Taxonomy articles created by Polbot